Guatteria boliviana is a species of flowering plant from the genus Guatteria, family Annonaceae, described by Hubert J.P. Winkler.

References

boliviana